ATP-dependent DNA helicase Q4 is an enzyme that in humans is encoded by the RECQL4 gene.

Mutations in RECQL4 are associated with the autosomal recessive disease Rothmund–Thomson syndrome, a disorder that has features of premature aging.  In addition to the Rothmund–Thomson syndrome, RECQL4 mutations are also associated with RAPADILINO and Baller–Gerold syndromes.  There are two types of Rothmund Thomson syndrome and it is Type 2 that occurs in patients carrying deleterious mutations in both copies of the RECQL4 gene.  This condition is associated with a high risk of developing osteosarcoma (malignant tumor of the bone).
RECQL4 gets its name from being homologous (sharing sequence) with other members of the RecQ helicase family.  Two other genetic diseases are due to mutations in other RECQ helicases. Bloom syndrome is associated with mutations in the BLM gene and Werner syndrome is associated with mutations in the WRN gene.

DNA repair

Double-strand breaks in DNA are potentially lethal to a cell and need to be repaired.  Repair of double-strand breaks by homologous recombination (HR) is an important cellular mechanism for avoiding this lethality.  RECQL4 has a crucial role in the first step of HR, referred to as end resection.  When RECQL4 is deficient, end resection, and thus HR, is reduced.  Evidence suggests that other forms of DNA repair including non-homologous end joining, nucleotide excision repair and base excision repair also depend on RECQL4 function.  In the Rothmund-Thomson syndrome, the association of deficient RECQL4-mediated DNA repair and premature aging is consistent with the DNA damage theory of aging.

References

Further reading

External links
  GeneReviews/NCBI/NIH/UW entry on Rothmund-Thomson Syndrome